The Zambia Wildlife Authority (ZAWA) was an autonomous agency of the  Zambian Government established to manage and conserve Zambia’s wildlife estate comprising 20 National Parks, 36 Game Management Areas and one bird sanctuary, which cover 31 percent of the country’s land mass.

It was established in 1999 under the Zambia Wildlife Act replacing the former Department of National Parks and Wildlife Service.

In 2015 it was announced that ZAWA would be abolished with its functions returning to the Ministry of Tourism and Arts.

In 2016 ZAWA was dissolved and its responsibilities passed to the newly formed Department of National Parks and Wildlife a department of the Ministry of Tourism and Arts.

Department of National Parks and Wildlife 
The Department of National Parks and Wildlife was established in 2015 to protect and conserve Zambia's wildlife and improve the quality of the life among communities in the wildlife estates.  The Department also aims to sustain e biodiversity in national parks  and game management areas.

See also 
The Zambia Wildlife Act 2015

References

Government agencies of Zambia
Wildlife conservation